Red Deer North is a provincial electoral district in Alberta, Canada. The district is mandated to return a single member to the Legislative Assembly of Alberta using the first past the post method of voting.

The district was created in the 1986 boundary redistribution. It was an all-urban district, until the 2004 boundary re-distribution. The constituency was expanded to include a small area outside the city limits, including the nearby town of Blackfalds. The constituency now only fits within the city limits of Red Deer.

The district has historically tilted toward the right, like Red Deer as a whole. It had been a Progressive Conservative stronghold since it was created, however in the 2015 provincial election, the seat was won by NDP candidate Kim Schreiner. The riding returned to its conservative ways in 2019, when Adriana LaGrange won it for the United Conservative Party.

History
The electoral district was created in the 1985 boundary redistribution from the Red Deer provincial electoral district. The city of Red Deer had been contained in a single electoral district since 1888 when it first started returning members to the Legislative Assembly of the Northwest Territories. The city was split into North and Red Deer-South.

By 1996, Red Deer-North had a population of 29,115.

The 2010 boundary redistribution saw adjustments made to Red Deer-North to give portions of the constituency that were outside of the city of Red Deer to Innisfail-Sylvan Lake to match the city boundary. The border with Red Deer-South was also adjusted to equalize the population between the two constituencies.

Boundary history

Representation history

The electoral district was created in the 1986 boundary redistribution. The first election held that year saw Progressive Conservative candidate Stockwell Day win a tight race to pick up the new seat for his party. He was re-elected by a larger margin in the 1989 election.

Premier Ralph Klein appointed Day to the cabinet in 1992 as the Minister of Labour. He was re-elected  less than a year later in the 1993 election with a landslide majority. In 1996 he was appointed as Minister of Family and Social Services. He won another term with a reduced majority in 1997. After that election Klein appointed him Provincial Treasurer. Day resigned on July 11, 2000 after being elected as federal leader of the Canadian Alliance.

A by-election was held on September 25, 2000. Day was replaced in the legislature by Progressive Conservative candidate Mary Anne Jablonski who won the hotly contested by-election. She won her second term less than a year later in the 2001 general election. She was re-elected again in 2004 and 2008. In 2008 Premier Ed Stelmach appointed Jablonski to the cabinet as Minister of Seniors and Community Supports.

Jablonski held the seat without serious difficulty until her retirement in 2015. That year, massive vote splitting resulted in Kim Schreiner taking the riding for the NDP, winning with just over 29 percent of the vote in a three-way race with the Tories and Wildrose. The riding reverted to form in 2019, with Adriana LaGrange of the newly merged United Conservative Party overwhelming Schreiner by a nearly 3-to-1 margin.

Legislature results

1986 general election

1989 general election

1993 general election

1997 general election

2000 by-election

2001 general election

2004 general election

2008 general election

2012 general election

2015 general election

2019 general election

Senate nominee results

2004 Senate nominee election district results
Voters had the option of selecting 4 Candidates on the Ballot

2012 Senate nominee election district results
Voters had the option of selecting 4 Candidates on the Ballot

Student vote results

2004 election

On November 19, 2004 a Student Vote was conducted at participating Alberta schools to parallel the 2004 Alberta general election results. The vote was designed to educate students and simulate the electoral process for persons who have not yet reached the legal majority. The vote was conducted in 80 of the 83 provincial electoral districts with students voting for actual election candidates. Schools with a large student body that reside in another electoral district had the option to vote for candidates outside of the electoral district then where they were physically located.

2012 election

References

External links 
Website of the Legislative Assembly of Alberta

Alberta provincial electoral districts
Politics of Red Deer, Alberta
1986 establishments in Alberta